Signe Ann-Mari Adamsson (22 January 1934 – 21 December 2011) was a Swedish actress.  She was born in Skee, Sweden, and her career lasted from the early 1950s until the late 1980s.

Filmography

References

External links

1934 births
2011 deaths
People from Strömstad Municipality
20th-century Swedish actresses